Skoki  is a town in Poland, Greater Poland Voivodeship, Wągrowiec County, with 3,779 inhabitants (December 2004). It is located about 40 km north of Poznań. It is the seat of the administrative district (gmina) called Gmina Skoki.

History
Established in 1367, it has always been a town with handicraft, in particular cloth weaving up to the 19th century. It was a private town of Polish nobility, administratively located in the Gniezno County in the Kalisz Voivodeship in the Greater Poland Province of the Polish Crown. The town's coat of arms comes from the Lubicz coat of arms of local Polish nobility.

During the joint German-Soviet invasion of Poland, which began World War II in September 1939, the town was invaded and then occupied by Germany until 1945. It was annexed directly into Nazi Germany and made part of the newly formed province of Reichsgau Wartheland. At this time, the Germans established a prisoner-of-war camp for officers (Oflag), named Oflag XXI-A, later renamed Oflag XXI-C. Among its prisoners were Polish and Norwegian officers.

Sights

In the town, there is a palace which is now part of the University of Fine Arts in Poznań, and a church which lies on the Wooden Churches Trail around Puszcza Zielonka.

Sports
The local football club is Wełna Skoki. It competes in the lower leagues.

References

Cities and towns in Greater Poland Voivodeship
Wągrowiec County